Ángel Ramón Paz Rápalo (28 October 1950 – 4 November 2008) was a Honduran footballer, who played for Olimpia and Real Juventud.

Club career
Nicknamed Mon, his debut in the Honduran league was on 22 June 1969 scoring one of the goals against Atlético Indio in the 3–0 victory.

International career
He has represented his country in two FIFA World Cup qualification matches and amassed 9 caps for Honduras.

Death
He died of stomach cancer on 4 November 2008.

References

External links
 Descanse en PAZ (Obituary) - La Tribuna 

1950 births
2008 deaths
People from Tela
Association football midfielders
Honduran footballers
Honduras international footballers
C.D. Real Juventud players
C.D. Olimpia players
Liga Nacional de Fútbol Profesional de Honduras players
Deaths from stomach cancer
Deaths from cancer in Honduras